Steven Titus Berry (born 1959) is the David Swensen Professor of Economics and the former Director of the Division of Social Sciences at Yale University. He specializes in econometrics and industrial organization. He is a fellow of the Econometric Society and a winner of the Frisch Medal. In April 2014, he was elected a member of the American Academy of Arts and Sciences, and in 2018, he was named the Jeffrey Talpins Faculty Director of Yale's Tobin Center for Economic Policy.

He is most famous for Berry–Levinsohn–Pakes (BLP) and other approaches to demand estimation.

He received his B.A. from Northwestern University in 1980 and an M.S. and Ph.D. from the University of Wisconsin–Madison in 1985 and 1989.

References

External links 
  Professor Berry's webpage at Yale
 BLP on JSTOR
 Berry 1994 on JSTOR

1959 births
Living people
University of Wisconsin–Madison alumni
Northwestern University alumni
Yale University faculty
Fellows of the Econometric Society
21st-century American economists
Econometricians
Microeconometricians
Fellows of the American Academy of Arts and Sciences